A mouse unit (MU) is the amount of toxin required to kill a 20g mouse in 15 minutes via Intraperitoneal injection. Mouse units are measured by a mouse bioassay, and are commonly used in the shellfish industry when describing relative toxicities for assessing food safety levels for human consumption.

References

Concentration indicators
Toxicology